Grodzisk Mazowiecki  is a town in central Poland with 29,363 inhabitants (2011). It is 30 km. southwest of Warsaw. Between 1975 and 1998 it was situated in the Warszawa Voivodeship but since 1999 it has been situated in the Masovian Voivodeship.  It is the capital of Grodzisk Mazowiecki County.

Demography

History
The origins of Grodzisk Mazowiecki can be traced back to the 12th century when medieval village Grodzisk was created.  This settlement was built on the outskirts of the Jaktorowska Forest and its remains are a part of the existing town area. In 1355 the first known owner of the settlement Tomasz Grodzinski founded a church which was later destroyed by fire (1441).  In 15th century Grodzisk remained the parish seat. 
Dating from the end of the 15th century to 1623 the village was owned by Okunia family and the  Mokrowski family. In 1522 Grodzisk Mazowiecki has received Municipal Rights from king Zygmunt (Sigismund) I Old. In 1540 Grodzisk was destroyed by the fire and was not reconstructed until the end of 16th century.  After the reconstruction, Grodzisk Mazowiecki became a local trade and production centre due to its location and the local traffic routes. In 1655 it was again destroyed during Swedish Deluge and then restored. In 1708 the town was struck by a cholera epidemic and as a result its population diminished down to 370 people. During the November Uprising (1830–1831) the town was the place of fights between the insurrectionists’ forces and Russian army. The recovery of the local economy was possible to the prosperous railway route connecting Warsaw and Skierniewice built in 1846. In 1870 the town's municipal rights were taken away. Between the 19th and 20th century Grodzisk was known as recreation center with hydropathic establishment founded by Michał Bojasiński. In 1915 Grodzisk regained its municipal rights
Currently,  Grodzisk Mazowiecki is a local industrial center for the area of Warsaw.

During World War II, Polish farmer Stanislawa Slawinska hid Jews from the Nazis and other Poles in her house in Grodzisk Mazowiecki. In 2008, she was honoured as Righteous Among the Nations by Yad Vashem. Among those she saved was the mother of the Israeli businessperson Yossi Maiman.

Geographic and administrative location

Until the 18th century Kingdom of Poland, Rawa Land, Rawa Province
1795-1807 Prussia
1807-1815 Duchy of Warsaw
1815-1918 Russia (Kingdom of Poland), Błonie County
1918-1939 Poland, Warsaw Province, Błonie County with the seat in Grodzisk
1939-1945 Germany (The Third Reich), The General Government (German: Generalgouvernement), Warsaw District, Błonie County with the seat in Grodzisk
1945-1998 Warsaw Province
From 1999 Mazowsze Province, Grodzisk County

Legends

According to a legend regarding the town charter, monarchs were riding through the settlement of Grodzisk on their way to hunt in Jaktorowska forest. One of the monarchs, who was tired, was offered a cup of water from the town's spring to regain his strength. It was the extraordinary taste of the water that convinced the king to grant the town a charter.

Jewish community
The town had a Jewish community and it had been the center of the Hasidic Grodzhisk dynasty, (Grodzisk Mazowiecki being pronounced as "Grodzhisk" in Yiddish.)  Grodzisk was the birthplace of Kalonymus Kalman Shapira (1889–1943), also known as the Rebbe of the Warsaw Ghetto. During the wartime all the Jewish population was deported and murdered.

In 2016, the remains of the Jewish cemetery in town were saved from being developed into a residential complex, and the city council pledged to preserve the cemetery, restore the original gate with Hebrew inscription, and build a fence around the property. Plans to build the residential complex were originally halted in 2014 when residents of the nearby Jewish community of Warsaw, as well as activist Robert Augustyniak, protested the plan.

Tourist attractions

 The Foksal Villa was built in 1845 in a shape of a small locomotive. It was built right after launching the first part of the Warsaw- Vienna railway.  The building is situated next to the old railway station.
 Milusin Villa, Kaprys Villa, Kniaziew Villa
 St. Anne's Parish Church was established in 1687. In the church there are numerous examples of sacred paintings from the 18th century.
 Antique Jewish cemetery was established in the 18th century
 Holy Cross Chapel was built in 1713 as a gesture of gratitude for the end of cholera epidemic. In 1995 the Chapel was moved next to the St. Anne's Church.
 Skarbek manor house was constructed in the 18th century. It is an example of baroque architecture.  Dating from 1869 it was the residence of the Skarbek family. Today, the building serves as a National Music School of the first degree.

Recreational areas
Walczewski Ponds
Golian Ponds
Skarbek Park

Sister cities
 Radviliškis, Lithuania

References

External links
 Jewish Community in Grodzisk Mazowiecki on Virtual Shtetl
 Grodzisk Mazowiecki independent news service Grodzisk Mazowiecki
 municipal office

Cities and towns in Masovian Voivodeship
Grodzisk Mazowiecki County
Warsaw Governorate
Warsaw Voivodeship (1919–1939)
Historic Jewish communities in Poland
Shtetls